Pavia, officially the Municipality of Pavia,  is a 2nd class municipality in the province of Iloilo, Philippines. According to the 2020 census, it has a population of 70,388 people.

Pavia is the smallest municipality in terms of area in Iloilo, covering only .

The Catholic church, currently undergoing restoration, is similar to one in Pavia, Italy.

Pavia is a part of the Metro Iloilo–Guimaras area, centered on Iloilo City.

Etymology
How the town got its name is unclear, and has long been disputed.  One theory has it that the name came from a certain Colonel Pavia of the Spanish garrison in Iloilo who was supposedly responsible for initially establishing a Spanish presence in the area .  Others believe that the name is a Spanish corruption of the Hiligaynon word biya-biya, as the area was originally considered a neglected patch of land that served mostly as a camping ground for city sophisticates and absentee landlords.  Others claim that the town was named after a Spanish governor-general, Manuel Pavia y Lay, Marquis of Novaliches, who eventually became a priest after his short tenure in the Philippines from 1853 to 1854.  However, the more credible theory seems to be the overlooked fact that the town's religious well-being was placed under the jurisdiction and supervision of the friars of the Augustinian Order, and they simply named the place in honor of the town of Pavia, Italy, where the founder of their order, Saint Augustine, was buried.

The last theory seems to be supported by circumstantial historical evidence: it was also in 1862 that an independent parish dedicated to Saint Monica was established by an Augustinian friar, Policarpio Minayo.  But it was only in 1889 when construction of the famous brick church—as it now stands—began.  It was envisioned and built in the Byzantine style, with Romanesque design elements.  Two Greek crosses dominate the facade, and the transept is round set against the rear wall.  It is unique in the whole of Panay Island, as it is the only church built entirely of red brick, inside and out.  Quite significantly, the church design was apparently inspired by the ancient royal arched basilica of San Michele Maggiore in Pavia, Italy—minus the front columns.

History
Pavia was settled by primitive Malays and later by Chinese approximately between the 15th and 16th centuries, corroborated by archaeological work at a Chinese burial ground in Cabugao Sur. The settlement had an estimated population of 200 to 400.

Separating from town of Jaro, Pavia was officially established in 1848, during the Spanish Colonial Era, by thirteen landowners in what used to be a “camping place”, a “settlement place” or an “abandoned place”.

Pavia became a part of Santa Barbara in 1901 and then in 1904 part of Iloilo City. In 1907, Pavia, together with Leganes, Iloilo and Jaro seceded from Iloilo City to become the suburb Jaro. Petronilo Gumban governed Pavia from 1916 until his election as Presidente Municipal of Jaro in 1920. In 1921, Pavia led by Delfin Gumban became an independent municipality.

Geography

Barangays
Pavia is politically subdivided into 18 barangays.

 Aganan
 Amparo
 Anilao
 Balabag
 Purok I (Poblacion)
 Purok II (Poblacion)
 Purok III (Poblacion)
 Purok IV (Poblacion)
 Cabugao Norte
 Cabugao Sur
 Jibao-an
 Mali-ao
 Pagsanga-an
 Pal-agon
 Pandac
 Tigum
 Ungka I
 Ungka II

Climate

Demographics

Economy

Pavia is one of the fastest growing economies in Iloilo. It is an agricultural-industrial center where Vitarich Corporation and New Panay Agri-ventures are located in Cabugao Sur, Pavia. It is now a commuter town where a number of suburban neighborhoods are located, such as Green Meadows, Providence, Centro Verde, Parc Regency, Centennial Homes, and Deca Homes. Pottery is also popular in Pavia. Barangay Pandac has a number of agricultural products. The newly renovated Mandaue Foam, City Mall, Puregold, GT Town Center, and Robinsons Place Pavia are new large establishments in the town. Panay News, a news media outlet, is also located in Pavia. It has several hotels: the Gateway Hotel, Sotogrande Hotel, JECA MJC Hotel & Event Center, etc. A new hospital opened called the Holy Mary Women and Children's Hospital. Robinsons Builders, Coca-Cola Bottling Company, and Taytay sa Kauswagan employed thousands of employees.

Mercado Central, a  commercial and business development within the  Sta. Lucia Land, Inc.'s Hacienda Verde township, is expected to be the center for trade and commerce in Pavia, composed of corporate and BPO offices, hotels, residentials, a mall, and a stadium. It is located along the Iloilo Circumferential Road 1 (C1).

Pavia is famous for "baye baye," a by-product of rice made from the newly harvested palay. Baye-baye is a sweet Ilonggo delicacy made from scraped young coconut meat, sugar and pinipig. Its century-old pottery industry especially in Barangay Pandac (Pik- Pik Koron) and Jibao-an still survives amid flower and bonsai gardens. Pottery makers made pots (coron), firewood-fired stoves (sig-ang), drinking jars (banga) and water containers (tadyaw) using the open pit firing method.

Government

Laurence Anthony G. Gorriceta is the present mayor.

List of former chief executives
The different Presidente Municipal (equivalent to Municipal Mayor now) who had served Pavia.
 Delfin Gumban  (1921–1924) – known to be Pavia's Father of Independence
 Domingo Guillem (1924–1927)
 Simplicio Hechanova (1927–1934)
 Pacifico Jabonillo (1934–1942)
 Buenaventura Gumban (1942–1945) Resistance Civil Government
 Cornelio Gumban (1942–1945) Japanese Government
 Juan de Dios Gonzaga (1945–1946)
 Luzon Gumban (1946–1952)
 Vicente Gerochi (1952–1955)
 Florencio Hisole (1956–1959)
 Gerardo Gorriceta (1960–1971)
 Nelson Gumban (1972–1986)
 Felix Gorriceta, Jr. (1986–1994)
 Rogelio Trimanez (1994–1995) serving the unexpired term of Mayor Gorriceta
 Felix Caronongan, Jr. (March – June 1995)
 Ervin G. Gerochi  (1995–2004)
 Arcadio H. Gorriceta (2004–2013)
 Michael B. Gorriceta (2013–2019)
 Laurence Anthony G. Gorriceta (2019–present)

Culture

Carabao-Carroza Race
Pavia, since 1973, holds the Carabao-Carroza Race Festival every 3 May. The Carabao is made the "king" for a day, and the race features carabaos each pulling a bamboo sled or "carrosa" on a 400-meter course. Carrozas with native designs are also paraded as part of festivities.

Tigkaralag Festival
The Tigkaralag festival is celebrated in consonance with All Souls' Day. The term "Tigkaralag" comes from the Ilonggo words, "tig," which means "season of," and "kalag," which means "soul". Participants from the municipality's 18 barangays wear costumes and parade themselves from Barangay Aganan to the town's plaza for a dance-drama competition with a storyline reflective of Tigkaralag. Held every 30th day of October, the festival was conceived by Cecilia H. Capadosa in 1992. Recently, Baye-baye night was included as a side event of the festival in celebration on one of the town's industry, the Baye-baye.

Pavia Parish Church
Pavia Parish Church, popularly known as Santa Monica Parish Church is a century-old church built by the Spanish Augustinian Fathers sometime in 1862. Its interior and exterior walls are made entirely of red-bricks, making it the only existing brick-constructed church in the island of Panay. This church is similar to the church of the town's namesake, Pavia in Italy.

References

External links
 Iloilo Travel Website
 
 [ Philippine Standard Geographic Code]
Philippine Census Information
Local Governance Performance Management System 

Municipalities of Iloilo
1848 establishments in the Philippines